Homma (本間) is a Japanese clan.

Honma Yoshihisa was appointed shugodai of Sado in 1185. The clan established its rule from Sawata.
The clan gave birth to two new branches, the Hamochi-Honma and the Kawarada-Honma. Those two branches eventually prevailed over the head clan and opposed each other. Uesugi Kenshin, ruler of the Echigo Province at the time, settled the ongoing conflicts between Hamochi-Honma and Kawarada-Honma. His death sparked a new rows of hostilities between the two branches, but Uesugi Kagekatsu invaded Sado in 1589, putting an end to the ruling of the clan.

References

Japanese clans